Nyctemera luzonensis is a moth of the family Erebidae first described by Alfred Ernest Wileman in 1915. It is found on Luzon in the Philippines.

Subspecies
Nyctemera luzonensis luzonensis (Philippines: northern Luzon)
Nyctemera luzonensis squalida De Vos & Černý, 1999 (Philippines: southern Luzon)

References

 , 1994: The browni-group of Nyctemera (Lepidoptera, Arctiidae) from the Philippines, with descriptions of three new species. Tinea 14 (1): 13-19.
 

Nyctemerina
Moths described in 1915